Beda is a given name and surname of multiple origin.

As a masculine given name, it originates as an Anglo-Saxon short name, West Saxon Bīeda, Northumbrian Bǣda, Anglian Bēda (the purported name of one of the Saxon founders of Portsmouth in AD 501 according to the Anglo-Saxon Chronicle) cognate with German Bodo. Beda Venerabilis was a Benedictine, in whose honour the name Beda was popularly chosen as a monastic name by Benedictines, and in modern times entered wider usage as a given name among Roman Catholics in continental Europe.

 Béda is an unrelated Hungarian feminine given name.

Given name
 Beda (Beda Venerabilis, the Venerable Bede) (672/3-735), Anglo-Saxon monk and historian
 Beda Angehrn (born Johann Konrad, 1725–1796), prince-abbot of Saint Gall
 Bede Clifford (1890-1969), British colonial administrator and diplomat
 Beda Dudík (1815–1890), Benedictine Moravian historian
 Bede Durbidge (born in 1983), Australian surfer
 Bede Jarrett (1881–1934) Dominican friar, Provincial of the English Dominicans, and founder of Blackfriars Priory, Oxford University.
 Beda Stjernschantz (1867–1910), Finnish symbolist painter
 Beda Weber (1798–1859), German writer

Surname
 Bartosz Beda, Polish contemporary artist
 Leonid Beda (1923–1995), Soviet Army officer
 Slavko Beda (1919–1975), Croatian footballer
 Pedro Beda (born 1989), Brazilian footballer

Pseudonym
pen name of Fritz Löhner-Beda (1883–1942), short form of  his given name Bedřich.

References

 

Masculine given names